Bernard Charles Glueck Jr. (August 26, 1914 – July 24, 1999) was an American psychiatrist. He served as director of research at The Institute of Living, now part of Hartford Hospital. He is known for his work on transcendental meditation as part of preventive psychiatry.

Life and career
His father Bernard Glueck Sr. was a prominent forensic psychiatrist. Glueck graduated from Columbia College, Columbia University in 1934 and Harvard Medical School in 1938. He then trained in psychoanalysis at Columbia University Psychoanalytic Clinic. Gleuck served as professor and director of research in the department of psychology at the University of Minnesota Medical School. Following in his father's footsteps, he was supervising psychiatrist at Ossining State Prison from 1949 to 1952. He was the first president of the Westchester County Psychiatric Association. He joined The Institute of Living in 1960.

He served as chairman of research and development for the American Psychiatric Association He also served as president of the American Psychopathological Association, chairman of the Narcotic Addiction and Drug Abuse Review Committee of the National Institute of Mental Health, and chairman of the Connecticut Council of Corrections Officers.

Glueck married in 1936 and remained married until their deaths 63 years later in Goshen, Connecticut within days of each other.

Selected publications
Glueck, Bernard C. Jr., Final report: Research project for the study and treatment of persons convicted of crimes involving sexual aberrations.  June 1952 to June 1955. New York State Department of Mental Hygiene/University of Minnesota
Hammer, Emmanuel F.; Glueck, Bernard C Jr (1955). Psychodynamic patterns in sex offender. Proceedings of the annual meeting of the American Psychopathological Association. 1955:157-68. 
Glueck, Bernard C. Jr., Evaluation of the Homosexual Offender. Minn. L. Rev. 187, An; 41  (1956-1957) 
Glueck, Bernard C.; Stroebel, Charles F., Biofeedback and meditation in the treatment of psychiatric illnesses. Comprehensive Psychiatry, Vol 16(4), Jul-Aug 1975, 303–321. doi: 10.1016/S0010-440X(75)80001-0

References

1914 births
1999 deaths
American psychiatrists
Harvard Medical School alumni
20th-century American physicians
People from Goshen, Connecticut
Columbia College (New York) alumni
University of Minnesota faculty